The 1962 Brown Bears football team was an American football team that represented Brown University during the 1962 NCAA University Division football season. Brown finished last in the Ivy League. 

In their fourth season under head coach John McLaughry, the Bears compiled a 1–6–2 record and were outscored 188 to 116. N.J. Spiezio was the team captain. 

The Bears' 0–6–1 conference record placed eighth in the Ivy League standings. They were outscored by Ivy opponents 174 to 89. 

Brown played its home games at Brown Stadium in Providence, Rhode Island.

Schedule

References

Brown
Brown Bears football seasons
Brown Bears football